Rick Anderson may refer to:

Musicians
Rick Anderson, bass player for the rock band The Tubes
Rick Anderson, singer for the metal bands Warlord, Lordian Winds, and Martiria

Others
Rick Anderson (political strategist), Canadian political strategist and businessman
Rick Anderson (baseball, born 1953) (1953–1989), New York Yankees and Seattle Mariners
Rick Anderson (baseball, born 1956) (born 1956), pitching coach for the Minnesota Twins; played for New York Mets and Kansas City Royals

See also
Ricky Anderson, boxer
Richard Anderson (disambiguation)